The East Lancs MaxCi was a low-floor single-decker bus body built on the Scania N113CRL chassis by East Lancashire Coachbuilders.

The MaxCi was based on a design produced for the Scania N113CLL low-entry single-decker bus chassis MaxCi in Sweden, and was built for the UK market between 1993 and 1995. Only twelve examples were produced, with nine of these being delivered to British Bus subsidiaries Midland Red North and Clydeside 2000, and one being delivered to Tayside.

The MaxCi was superseded by the step-entrance European on the Scania L113CRL chassis.

See also

 List of buses

References

 Millar, Alan (2007) Bus & Coach Recognition (5th Edition) : Ian Allan Ltd.,

External links

MaxCi
Low-floor buses
Low-entry buses
Vehicles introduced in 1993